Mytilicola intestinalis is an internal copepod parasite of mussels native to the Mediterranean and Adriatic Seas. It invaded the Wadden Sea in the 1930s and since then has slowly expanded its distribution throughout the Wadden Sea. This spread has been northward and towards the southwest. In these two separate expansions local adaptation has occurred.

References

Cyclopoida